Corryn Cecile Brown (born July 19, 1995) is a Canadian curler from British Columbia. She currently skips her own team out of Kamloops.

Career
She was the skip of the winning team at the 2013 Canadian Junior Curling Championships, and represented Canada at the 2013 World Junior Curling Championships, where she placed 9th. Brown also represented Canada at the 2012 Winter Youth Olympics where she won a bronze medal. She also won a gold medal at the 2011 Canada Winter Games. Brown and her team competed once again at the 2015 Canadian Junior Curling Championships in Corner Brook, Newfoundland and Labrador, where they won the bronze medal after losing to Ontario in the semi-finals 9–4. In her last year of junior eligibility, Brown claimed the BC Junior Title and represented BC at the 2017 Canadian Junior Curling Championships in Victoria BC. Brown finished with a 5–5 record, failing to make the playoffs. On the World Curling Tour, Brown has won the 2014 Coronation Business Group Classic, the 2016 Qinghai China Women's International, the 2018 King Cash Spiel and the 2018 Sunset Ranch Kelowna Double Cash. 

In their first event of the 2019–20 season, they missed the playoffs at the Booster Juice Shoot-Out. They then missed the playoffs at the 2019 Colonial Square Ladies Classic. They then made the playoffs at six straight events starting with the Prestige Hotels & Resorts Curling Classic where they made it to the quarterfinals. The following week, they won the Driving Force Decks Int'l Abbotsford Cashspiel and two weeks after that they won the Kamloops Crown of Curling. Their next event was the Tour Challenge Tier 2 where they lost to Jestyn Murphy in the semifinal. They also made the semifinal at the Red Deer Curling Classic. They lost the final of the 2019 China Open in mid-December, their last event of 2019. Brown won her first provincial title at the 2020 British Columbia Scotties Tournament of Hearts when they stole in the extra end to defeat defending champions Sarah Wark. At the 2020 Scotties Tournament of Hearts, Team BC finished with a 5–6 record and they finished in sixth place.

Team Brown began the 2020–21 curling season by winning the 2020 Sunset Ranch Kelowna Double Cash. Due to the COVID-19 pandemic in British Columbia, the 2021 provincial championship was cancelled. As the reigning provincial champions, Team Brown was invited to represent British Columbia at the 2021 Scotties Tournament of Hearts, which they accepted. At the Hearts, Brown led her team to a 4–4 round robin record, failing to qualify for the championship round.

Personal life
Brown attended Thompson Rivers University and works as a training analyst for the BC Wildfire Service. She is engaged to Matt Whiteford.

Grand Slam record

References

External links

Canadian women curlers
1995 births
Curlers from British Columbia
Living people
Curlers at the 2012 Winter Youth Olympics
Sportspeople from Kamloops
Youth Olympic bronze medalists for Canada